Rudy Salles (born July 30, 1954 in Nice) was a member of the National Assembly of France from 1988 to 2017, representing the Alpes-Maritimes department, as a member of first the Union for French Democracy, then the New Centre.

In addition to his work in parliament, Salles served as member of the French delegation to the Parliamentary Assembly of the Council of Europe from 2002 until 2007 and again from 2010 until 2017. In this capacity, he was a full member of the Committee on Rules of Procedure, Immunities and Institutional Affairs as well as a substitute on the Committee on the Election of Judges to the European Court of Human Rights.

References

1954 births
Living people
People from Nice
Union for French Democracy politicians
The Centrists politicians
Deputies of the 11th National Assembly of the French Fifth Republic
Deputies of the 12th National Assembly of the French Fifth Republic
Deputies of the 13th National Assembly of the French Fifth Republic
Deputies of the 14th National Assembly of the French Fifth Republic
Union of Democrats and Independents politicians